Gavin Richard Haynes (born 29 September 1969) is a retired professional  cricketer who played for Worcestershire from 1991 to 1999. Haynes now coaches Dudley District Cricket club and plays for Ombersley C.C.

External links
 

1969 births
Living people
English cricketers
Worcestershire cricketers